was an ukiyo-e artist and painter who was known for his bird-and-flower paintings. Shunboku was born in the Kansai region, and lived most of his professional life in Osaka.

Throughout his career Shunboku engraved reproductions of old masters, such as early exponents of the Kanō school. From the late 1710s until shortly before his death, he reproduced numerous paintings for various books. One of these anthologies is Ehon tekagami (1720), an e-hon ("picture book") in which Shunboku attempts to demonstrate the characteristic style of each artist. (A tekagami is a hand mirror.) His notes and citations preserve some otherwise obscure works, and the names of their creators. His efforts helped propagate classic paintings throughout Japan.

Shunboku edited Mincho shiken (1746), a two-volume illustrated album printed in colour by Shibukawa Seiemon et al.

See also
List of Japanese artists
List of ukiyo-e terms
Schools of ukiyo-e artists
Woodblock printing in Japan

Further reading

1680 births
1763 deaths
17th-century Japanese artists
18th-century Japanese artists
Ukiyo-e artists